Alexa Pienaar (born 10 July 1994) is a South African professional squash player who currently plays for South Africa women's national squash team. She achieved her highest career PSA singles ranking of 97 in November 2019. She also emerged as runners-up to England's Lily Taylor in the women's singles finals during the 2018 World University Squash Championships.

References

External links 

 Profile at PSA
 

1994 births
Living people
South African female squash players
Sportspeople from Pretoria